The National News Agency of Ukraine, or Ukrinform, is a state information and news agency, and international broadcaster of Ukraine. It was founded in 1918 during the Ukrainian War of Independence as the Bureau of Ukrainian Press (BUP). The first director of the agency was Dmytro Dontsov, when the agency name was The Ukrainian Telegraph Agency.

History

The state agency was established as the Bureau of Ukrainian Press (BUP) in 1918, yet since then it went through a series of reorganizations. During the Soviet period, it was associated with Telegraph Agency of the Soviet Union (TASS).
 1918 – Bureau of Ukrainian Press
 1920 – All-Ukrainian bureau of the Russian Telegraph Agency (UkROSTA)
 1921 – Radio-Telegraph Agency of Ukraine (RATAU)
 1990 – Ukrainian National Informational Agency (UKRINFORM)
 1996 – State Informational Agency of Ukraine (DINAU)
 2000 – Ukrainian National Informational Agency (UKRINFORM)
2015 – Ukrinform became a part of the Multimedia Broadcasting Platform of Ukraine (UA|TV)
2018 – Ukrinform signed a co-operation agreement with the Athens–Macedonian News Agency (ANA) providing for an exchange of news items in all categories.

Outlook
Ukrinform's main objectives are: the coverage of public policy and public life in Ukraine and providing information to government bodies; according to a Decree of the Cabinet of Ministers of Ukraine from February 19, 1997 the agency carries out its activities independently of political
parties and public organizations.

Per day Ukrinform issues some 500 reports in English, German, Russian, Ukrainian, Polish, French, Spanish, Japanese and around 200 photos and audio digest. Ukrinform delivers information to the media, TV channels, radio stations, official establishments and local governments, foreign embassies and Ukrainian diplomatic missions abroad and foreign media.

Television 

FREEДОМ (formerly UATV) is a Russian-language television news channel with focus on the Russo-Ukrainian War. It's transmitted live on its website, via satellite, and through cable television operators. It has content in English on YouTube. Prior to its temporary closure in January 2020, the channel also broadcast in English, Ukrainian, Crimean Tatar and Arabic.

References

External links
 Ukrinform - Ukrainian National News Agency (English)
 Ukrinform - Ukrainian National News Agency (Ukrainian)
 Agency's statute (Statement of the Cabinet of Ministers)
 
 

 
1918 establishments in Ukraine
Mass media in Kyiv
Ukrainian brands
Ukrainian news websites
State companies of Ukraine
International broadcasters
Institutions with the title of National in Ukraine